Princess Anna Katarzyna Radziwiłłowa (1676-1746), was a Polish–Lithuanian noblewoman and industrialist.

She was the daughter of Hieronim Sanguszko and Konstancja Sapieha, and married Prince Karol Stanisław Radziwiłł March 6, 1691 in Wilno. She was known for her despotic personality and blamed for the negative acts of her husband as grand chancellor of Lithuania. She was also known for her business enterprises: she created a fortune by founding textile factories and glass factories.

References

 Anna Katarzyna Radziwiłłowa hasło [w] Polski Słownik Biograficzny tom.30 str.384 wyd.1987

18th-century Polish nobility
18th-century Polish women
1746 deaths
Anna Katarzyna Sanguszko
18th-century Polish–Lithuanian businesspeople
Anna Katarzyna
1676 births